Jamie Swift is a Canadian journalist, author, and activist. His body of work has focused largely on issues of social justice, economy, environment, globalization, and politics.

Swift was born in Montreal, Quebec where, in 1968, he pursued a degree in African Studies at McGill University. Upon moving to Toronto in the mid-seventies, Swift became involved in the social activist community and subsequently began his writing career. In 1977, he published his first book, The Big Nickel: Inco at home and abroad, which examined the effect of nickel production in third world countries.

Over the course of his career, Swift has been published in numerous journals and newspapers, including The Globe and Mail, The Montreal Gazette, The Kingston Whig Standard, and Briarpatch. Throughout the 1990s, he was a regular contributor on CBC's radio series Ideas. Most recently, Swift has co-written a book with noted Canadian historian Ian McKay entitled Warrior Nation: Rebranding Canada in an Age of Anxiety,  released in May 2012. He currently lectures at the Queen's School of Business  in Kingston, Ontario.

Awards 

In 1996, Swift was awarded the Michener-Deacon Fellowship for Public Service Journalism. He received the award from Governor General Roméo LeBlanc in a ceremony on May 6, 1996 at Rideau Hall in Ottawa. R

Selected works

The Big Nickel: Inco at Home and Abroad (1977) 
Cut and Run: The Assault on Canada's Forests (1983) 
Conflicts of Interest: Canada and the Third World (1991)  
Wheel of Fortune: Work and Life in the Age of Falling Expectations (1995)  
Civil Society in Question (1999)  
Getting Started on Social Analysis in Canada, Fourth Edition (2003)  
Walking the Union Walk: Stories from the Communications, Energy, and Paperworkers Union (2003)  
Hydro: The Decline and Fall of Ontario's Electric Empire (2004)  
Persistent Poverty: Voices from the Margins (2010)  
Warrior Nation: Rebranding Canada in an Age of Anxiety (2012)

References

External links 
 Between the Lines Books: Our Story
 The Michener Awards: Jamie Swift Report
 Swift, Jamie."A shock to the system." The Globe and Mail. Jan. 25, 2002. 

Anglophone Quebec people
Canadian radio journalists
Journalists from Montreal
Living people
Year of birth missing (living people)
Canadian newspaper journalists